Emily Wold (born September 26, 1994) is a former American field hockey player, who played as a midfielder.

Personal life
Wold was born in Englewood, New Jersey to Mark and Kathleen Wold. Raised in Freehold Township, New Jersey, she began playing hockey at 12 years old in 2006 and attended Freehold High School, from which she graduated in 2012.

She was a student at the University of North Carolina and majored in communication studies.

Career

Junior National Team
In 2012, Wold was a member of the United States U–21 team at the Junior Pan American Cup in Guadalajara, Mexico where the team won bronze. At the tournament, Wold was captain of the team.

Senior National Team
Wold made her senior international debut in 2013, at the FIH World League Round 2 in Rio de Janeiro, Brazil.

Following her debut, Wold was a mainstay in the national team for three years until her retirement in 2016. During her career, Wold medalled with the team three times, gold at the 2014 Champions Challenge I and 2015 Pan American Games, as well as bronze at the 2016 Champions Trophy.

Wold announced her retirement from the national team in 2016, after she failed to gain selection for the 2016 Olympic Games.

International goals

References

1994 births
Living people
American female field hockey players
Freehold High School alumni
People from Englewood, New Jersey
People from Freehold Township, New Jersey
Sportspeople from Bergen County, New Jersey
Sportspeople from Monmouth County, New Jersey
University of North Carolina alumni
Pan American Games medalists in field hockey
Pan American Games gold medalists for the United States
Field hockey players at the 2015 Pan American Games
Medalists at the 2015 Pan American Games
21st-century American women